Thomas Wydler (born 9 October 1959), is a Swiss musician best known for being a core member of Nick Cave and the Bad Seeds, of which he has been a drummer since 1985. Prior to joining them, he was a member of the experimental German band Die Haut. Wydler has been present on almost every Bad Seeds album, making his debut appearance on the group's third album Kicking Against The Pricks (1986). After the departure of founding member Mick Harvey in January 2009, Wydler became the longest-serving member of the Bad Seeds apart from singer Nick Cave.

Wydler was the band's sole drummer until Jim Sclavunos joined in 1994. Wydler generally plays a standard drum kit while Sclavunos handles a variety of auxiliary percussion (e.g., vibraphone, maracas, cowbell, tubular bells), but occasionally this is reversed and sometimes both men play conventional drums alongside each other (see double drumming). Due to unspecified health problems Wydler did not tour with the band from about 2013, but he remains a member of the group and has contributed to all studio albums since joining. Founding Bad Seed Barry Adamson temporarily rejoined the group during this era as a drummer, given that many of the band's newer songs were arranged for two percussionists. Wydler rejoined the Bad Seeds on tour in 2017.

Wydler has performed vocals on the album Murder Ballads singing a verse from "Death Is Not the End", and also pursues his solo career which can be heard on his Myspace page.

References

External links
 Thomas Wydler on MySpace
 Imdb entry

1959 births
Swiss drummers
Swiss male musicians
Male drummers
Nick Cave and the Bad Seeds members
Living people
Die Haut members
Musicians from Zürich